976 or variation, may refer to:

 976 (number), a number in the 900s range

Time
 AD 976, a year in the first millennium of the Common Era
 976 BC, a year in the first millennium Before Common Era
 9/76, September 1976
 97/6, June 1997

Places
 976 Benjamina (1922 LU), a main-belt asteroid, the 976th asteroid registered
 highway 976, any of several roads

People
 Guantanamo captive 976

Telephony
 976 telephone numbers, phone numbers using local exchange code 976 in North America, which are additional charge telephone calls
 +976, the international dialing code for Mongolia

Military
Ships pennant number 976
 , a WWII submarine
 , a Cold War era Taiwanese destroyer
 , a 21st-century South Korean destroyer
 , a Cold War era U.S. Navy destroyer
 , a WWII U.S. Navy landingship for tanks that was converted into a repair ship
 , a WWII U.S. Navy landingship for infantry

Legislation
 2019 Washington Initiative 976, a ballot initiative in the U.S. state of Washington
 H.R. 976, a U.S. federal bill to reauthorize the Children's Health Insurance Program, 2007
 United Nations Security Council Resolution 976, for a peacekeeping force in Angola, 1995

Other uses
 976 (New Jersey bus)
 976-EVIL, a horror movie

See also

 
 BWV 976, J.S.Bach concerto
 United Airlines Flight 976, a 1995 flight that resulted in a case of extreme air rage